SOIUSA (an acronym for  - English: International Standardized Mountain Subdivision of the Alps-ISMSA) is a proposal for a new classification system of the Alps from the geographic and toponomastic point of view.
It was designed by Sergio Marazzi, Italian researcher and author of the Orographic Atlas of the Alps SOIUSA. His book was presented with the patronage of the Italian Alpine Club on 23 Jan 2006, but has yet to receive any formal acceptance.

History
SOIUSA takes into account the European geographic literature normalizing and standardizing the different national classification systems in use. It was publicly presented in a lecture organized by the Italian Alpine Club's Milan conference of 6 April 2006, following the publication of Marazzi's book.

Structure

The SOIUSA introduces the bipartition of the Alpine System (Western Alps and Eastern Alps) replacing the old tripartite division (Western Alps, Central Alps and Eastern Alps) by a multilevel pyramidal hierarchy according to identical scales and rules.

Mountain groups higher level:
fractionated with morphological and altimetric benchmark taking into account the historical and geographical regions in the Alps.

 2 main parts (PT) (de:;  fr:; it:; sl:):
 Western Alps and Eastern Alps.
 5 major sectors (SR)   (de:;  fr:; it:; sl:):
 the occidental part is divided into two areas from south to north and then northeast: Southwestern Alps and Northwestern Alps;
 the oriental part is divided into three areas from west to east: Central Eastern Alps, North Eastern Alps, South Eastern Alps.
 36 sections  (SZ)  (de:;  fr:; it:; sl:).
 132 subsections (STS)  (de:;  fr:; it:; sl:).

Mountain groups lower level:
divided with a benchmark  mountaineering.

 333 supergroups (SPG) (de:;  fr:; it:; sl:).
 870 groups (GR) (de:;   fr:; it:; sl:).
 1625 subgroups (STG) (de:;  fr:; it:; sl:).

(With some relative sectors (SR) intermediate to groups above)

To any alpine mountain can be assigned a SOIUSA code, which shows to what part, sector, section, subsection, supergroup, group and subgroup the mountain belongs.

Example: 
{| border="1" cellpadding="5" cellspacing="0"
|
SOIUSA parametres for Pointe Sommeiller (Fr) / Punta Sommeiller (It) are:
 Main part:Western Alps
  Major sector:Southwestern Alps
   Section:Cottian Alps
    Subsection:Northern Cottian Alps
     Supergroup: (Fr) /
                 (It) 
      Group: (Fr) /
             (It) 
       Subgroup: (Fr) /
                 (It) 
 Code:I/A-4.III-B.6.b
|}

Naming 
Names of higher level groups are given in the four main languages spoken in  the Alps (German, French, Italian, Slovene) and in English, while lower level groups are just named in the language/languages of the concerned country/countries.

Examples: 
{| border="1" cellpadding="5" cellspacing="0"
|
Northern Cottian Alps subsection (STS.4.III ) is also called:
  (De),
  (Fr),
  (It),
  (Sl).

Ambin group, located on the French-Italian border, is just referred as:
  (Fr) and
  (It).
|}

Western Alps

From the line  Savona - Bocchetta di Altare  - Montezemolo - Mondovì to the line Rhine -  Splügen Pass - Lake Como - Lake Lecco;  they are divided in 14 sections (in brackets their highest summit).

Southwestern Alps

  1. Ligurian Alps (Punta Marguareis)
  2. Maritime Alps (Monte Argentera)
  3. Provence Alps and Prealps (Tête de l'Estrop)
  4. Cottian Alps (Monviso)
  5. Dauphiné Alps (Barre des Écrins)
  6. Dauphiné Prealps (Grande Tête de l'Obiou)

Northwestern Alps

   7. Graian Alps (Mont Blanc)
   8. Savoy Prealps (Haute Cime des Dents du Midi)
   9. Pennine Alps (Monte Rosa)
 10. Lepontine Alps (Monte Leone)
 11. Lugano Prealps  (Pizzo di Gino)
 12. Bernese Alps i.t.w.m. (Finsteraarhorn)
 13. Glarus Alps i.t.w.m.  (Tödi)
 14. Swiss Prealps (Schilthorn)

Eastern Alps

From the line Rhine -  Splügen Pass - Lake Como - Lake Lecco to the line Vienna-Sopron-Köszeg-Graz-Maribor and Godovič Pass; they are divided in 22 sections (in brackets their highest summit).

Central-eastern Alps

 15. Western Rhaetian Alps (Piz Bernina)
 16. Eastern Rhaetian Alps (Wildspitze)
 17  Western Tauern Alps (Großglockner)
 18. Eastern Tauern Alps (Hochgolling)
 19. Carinthian-Styrian Alps (Eisenhut)
 20. Styrian Prealps (Ameringkogel)

Northeastern Alps

 21. North Tyrol Limestone Alps  (Parseierspitze)
 22. Bavarian Alps (Großer Krottenkopf)
 23. Tyrol Schistose Alps (Lizumer Reckner)
 24. Northern Salzburg Alps (Hochkönig)
 25. Salzkammergut and Upper Austria Alps  (Hoher Dachstein)
 26. Northern Styrian Alps (Hochtor)
 27. Northern Lower Austria Alps  (Hochstadl)

Southeastern Alps

 28. Southern Rhaetian Alps (Ortler)
 29. Bergamasque Alps and Prealps (Pizzo di Coca)
 30. Brescia and Garda Prealps (Monte Cadria)
 31. Dolomites (Marmolada)
 32. Venetian Prealps (Col Nudo)
 33. Carnic and Gailtal Alps (Monte Coglians)
 34. Julian Alps and Prealps (Triglav)
 35. Carinthian-Slovenian Alps (Grintovec)
 36. Slovenian Prealps (Porezen)

See also 
 Alpine Club classification of the Eastern Alps
 SOIUSA code

References and footnotes

Sources 

 Marazzi, Sergio; Grimm, Peter; Mattmüller, Claus R; Zahn, Paul; Jurgalski, Eberhard (2004), Die Gebirgsgruppen der Alpen:Ansichten, Systematiken und Methoden zur Einteilung der Alpen. Die orographischen einteilungen der Alpen und die IVOEA, German and Austrian Alpine Clubs, (German/English) Munich, pp. 69–96 .
 Marazzi, Sergio (1991). Atlante orografico del monte Bianco, Priuli & Verlucca.
 Marazzi, Sergio (2005). Atlante Orografico delle Alpi. SOIUSA, Priuli & Verlucca, .
 Marazzi, Sergio (2012). SOIUSA - Suddivisione orografica internazionale unificata del Sistema Alpino , on-line article at www.fioridimontagna.it, accessed on 7 Feb 2012

!
Alps